Manicheppu Thurannappol is a 1985 Indian Malayalam film, directed by Balachandra Menon and produced by Babu Savior. The film stars Sukumari, Thilakan, Balachandra Menon and Karthika (in her leading debut) in the lead roles. The film has musical score by Darsan Raman.

Cast 
Sukumari
Thilakan
Balachandra Menon
Jalaja
Karthika

Soundtrack 
The music was composed by Darsan Raman.

References

External links 
 

1985 films
1980s Malayalam-language films
Films directed by Balachandra Menon